Belonechitina is an extinct genus of chitinozoans. It was described by Jansonius in 1964. Fossils of members of this genus have been found mainly in the northern hemisphere in Canada,  China, Oman, and in Western and Northern Europe.

Species

 Belonechitina aspera (Nestor, 1980)
 Belonechitina cactacea (Eisenack, 1937)
 Belonechitina capitata (Eisenack, 1962)
 Belonechitina comma (Eisenack, 1959)
 Belonechitina crinita (Grahn, 1984)
 Belonechitina gamachiana (Achab, 1978)
 Belonechitina granosa (Laufeld, 1974)
 Belonechitina hirsuta (Laufeld, 1967)
 Belonechitina intonsa Nõlvak et Bauert, 2015
 Belonechitina jaanussonii Grahn et Nõlvak, 2010
 Belonechitina latifrons (Eisenack, 1964)
 Belonechitina meifodensis Mullins et Loydell, 2001
 Belonechitina micracantha (Eisenack, 1931)
 Belonechitina oeselensis Nestor, 2005
 Belonechitina pellifera (Eisenack, 1959)
 Belonechitina postrobusta (Nestor, 1980)
 Belonechitina robusta (Eisenack, 1959)
 Belonechitina synclinalis (Eisenack, 1965)
 Belonechitina villosa (Grahn, 1982)

References

Prehistoric marine animals
Fossil taxa described in 1964
Paleozoic life of Quebec
Fossils of Canada
Fossils of China
Fossils of Estonia
Fossils of Latvia
Fossils of Oman
Fossils of Spain
Fossils of Great Britain
Ordovician animals
Silurian animals